The 179th Massachusetts General Court, consisting of the Massachusetts Senate and the Massachusetts House of Representatives, met in 1995 and 1996 during the governorship of Bill Weld. William Bulger served as president of the Senate and Charles Flaherty served as speaker of the House.

Senators

Representatives

See also
 Massachusetts Burma Law
 104th United States Congress
 List of Massachusetts General Courts

Images

References

Further reading

External links

 
 
 
 
 

Political history of Massachusetts
Massachusetts legislative sessions
massachusetts
1995 in Massachusetts
massachusetts
1996 in Massachusetts